Cell adhesion molecule 1 is a protein that, in humans, is encoded by the CADM1 gene.

Model organisms

Model organisms have been used in the study of CADM1 function. A conditional knockout mouse line, called Cadm1tm1.2Brd was generated. Male and female animals underwent a standardized phenotypic screen to determine the effects of deletion. Twenty six tests were carried out on homozygous mutant mice and one significant abnormality was observed: males were infertile. Further analysis showed spermatogenesis had arrested in these mice.

Interactions
Cell adhesion molecule 1 has been shown to interact with EPB41L3.

Association studies
Genome-wide association studies identified an association between body mass index and two loci near the CADM1 and CADM2 gene.  Experimental results of another study showed that obese mice had an over expression of both CADM1 and CADM2 genes, and that loss of CADM1 protected mice from obesity, promoting a negative energy balance and weight loss. 
Furthermore, a 2019 GWAS study revealed an association between Anorexia nervosa and CADM1.
In the brain, this genes mediate synaptic assembly, and mutations in CADM1 are also associated with Autistic spectrum disorder.

See also
 Cell adhesion molecule
 Nectin

References

Further reading

Genes mutated in mice